The Samaná threadsnake (Mitophis calypso) is a critically endangered species of snake in the family Leptotyphlopidae. It is endemic to the Samaná Peninsula in the Dominican Republic on the island of Hispaniola.

References

Mitophis
Endemic fauna of the Dominican Republic
Reptiles of the Dominican Republic
Reptiles described in 1985
Taxa named by Richard Thomas (herpetologist)